La Gare de Perpignan (Perpignan Train Station also known as Pop-Op-Yes-Yes-Pompier) is a c. 1965 large-scale oil on canvas painting by the Spanish surrealist Salvador Dalí, on display in the Museum Ludwig in Cologne.

The railway station of the French city of Perpignan, near the border with Spain, held special significance for Dalí, who had proclaimed it to be the "Center of the Universe" after experiencing a vision of cosmogonic ecstasy there in 1963.

Description 
The sacrifice of the son is imaged in the form of Christ on the Cross, with his crown of thorns, floating in the center of the composition. The bleeding wound of Christ is associated with the farmer's fork (on the right) thrust into the ground (as a fertility ritual). Dalí is represented twice in the vertical axis: he appears in the light at the center of the image, seen from below, floating with arms spread, and again at the top of the painting. On the bottom of the painting lies a calm sea with a boat, an ancient symbol of the passage from life to death, reinforcing the theme of Christ's sacrifice. Above the sea, a woman seen from the back watches these scenes, immobile, and recalling the helplessness of man facing death, symbolized not only by the bloody wounds of Christ, but also by Dalí, who, spread-eagled, seems to fall into nothingness.

At the top center of the painting, a flat wagon carrying a specialized trailer comes out of nowhere (characteristic of Surrealism), and reminds one of the central themes of the painting, the railway station of Perpignan in France, near the Spanish border in the Pyrenees. The left side of the painting shows embodiment of positive values (the couple on the bags of wheat represent labor, and the man in a meditative pose embodies respect), while on the right of the image are embodied sins and suffering (the man and woman representing lust, and the woman mourning).  The two figures flanking the far left and right sides are taken from The Angelus, a well-known pious painting by the French artist Jean-François Millet.

Bibliography

References

Paintings by Salvador Dalí
1965 paintings
Paintings depicting the Crucifixion of Jesus
Ships in art
Collections of the Museum Ludwig